The First Military Region is a military region of Armed Forces of Yemen. Its headquarters is in Seiyun of Hadramawt, eastern Yemen. It is responsible for managing administrative issues of the military units in parts of Hadramawt Governorate, including Seiyun city.

History 
The first region was established in 2013. As part of the military restructuring, former president Abdrabbuh Mansur Hadi issued a republication decree to divide the military field into seven regions, including the First Military Region. The region is headquartered in Seiyun and supervises the military units in Al-Wadi and Al-Sahra of Hadramout Governorate.

Structure 
The region is composed of seven military units and brigades, including; 37th Armored Brigade, 123th Infantry Brigade and 315th Armored Brigade.

Leadership 

 Major General Mohammed Abdullah al-Saumali (2013–2014)
 Major General Abdularahman al-Halili (2014–2016)
 Major General Saleh Taimas (21 November 2016– incumbent)

See also 

 2nd Military Region

References 

Military regions of Yemen
Military of Yemen
Ministry of Defense (Yemen)
2013 establishments in Yemen